The Agreed Lists of Liberals, Democrats and Radicals were a liberal and radical political alliance in Italy in the first decades of the 20th century.

History
It was formed for the 1919 Italian general election, arriving third after the Italian Socialist Party and the Italian People's Party, with 15.9% and 96 seats, doing particularly well in Piedmont and Southern Italy, especially in Sicily, the home-region of party's leader and former Prime Minister Vittorio Emanuele Orlando.

Ideology
The Liberals, Democrats, and Radicals were the expression of the liberalism and radicalism in Italy and the upper-middle class, such as cities' bourgeoisie, business owners, and artisans. In the alliance, there were also a main group of the Italian Radical Party. The alliance supported a right to vote and the public school for all children.

Electoral results

References

Radical parties in Italy
Liberal parties in Italy
1919 establishments in Italy
1921 disestablishments in Italy
Political parties established in 1919
Political parties disestablished in 1921